The Andalusian School of Public Health (Spanish language acronym: EASP) is a public institution which provides training, consultancy and research services for the healthcare sector. It is located in Granada (Spain), on the University campus. It is a state-owned enterprise, promoted by the Andalusian government.

Universities and colleges in Spain